McGoohan is an Irish and Scottish surname. Notable people with the surname include:

 Patrick McGoohan (1928–2009), Irish-American actor, known for The Prisoner
 Catherine McGoohan (born 1952), British actress, daughter of Patrick McGoohan

See also
 McGowan

Surnames of Scottish origin